The men's singles event at the 2017 Asian Winter Games was held on 24 and 26 February 2017 at the Makomanai Ice Arena in Sapporo, Japan.

Schedule
All times are Japan Standard Time (UTC+09:00)

Results

References

External links
Results

Men